Renwick Bishop (born 10 September 1965) is a Trinidadian cricketer. He played in eleven first-class and twenty-two List A matches for Trinidad and Tobago from 1986 to 1997.

See also
 List of Trinidadian representative cricketers

References

External links
 

1965 births
Living people
Trinidad and Tobago cricketers